Christian Krohg (15 January 1777 – 10 November 1828) was a Norwegian councillor of state without ministry in 1814, member of the Council of State Division in Stockholm 1815–1816, Minister of the Interior and Minister of Finance in 1816, Minister of Education and Church Affairs 1816–1817 as well as head of Ministry of the Police in 1817, Minister of Education and Church Affairs and Minister of Justice in 1817, Minister of Justice 1817–1818, as well as head of Ministry of the Police in 1818, and councillor of state without ministry in 1818.

He served as praeses of the Royal Norwegian Society of Sciences and Letters from 1820 to his death. Krohg was the grandfather of Christian Krohg, the painter.

References

1777 births
1828 deaths
Government ministers of Norway
Presidents of the Storting
Royal Norwegian Society of Sciences and Letters
Ministers of Finance of Norway
Place of birth missing
Place of death missing
Ministers of Justice of Norway
Ministers of Education of Norway